McIntosh Bluff was one of the earliest white settlements in Alabama, United States. Although it is now in Mobile County, it was the first county seat of Baldwin County. It was the birthplace of early Georgia Governor George Troup. McIntosh Bluff began as a base of operations for members of the McIntosh clan who were working in the area to convince the Muscogee to side with the British against American colonists in the American Revolutionary War. . George Troup, Senator of Georgia from 1816 until 1818 and from 1829 until 1833, and governor of Georgia from 1823 until 1827 was born in McIntosh Bluff in 1780.

References

Geography of Mobile County, Alabama
History of Alabama